The 2021–22 Kerala Premier League was the ninth season of the Kerala Premier League. The season featured 24 teams and was played on multiple venues. This season Kerala Football Association decided to add 12 more participants into the league.

Qualifiers

Teams

Foreign players

Group stage

Group A
<onlyinclude>

Fixtures
Source: 
 Cancelled matches

Group B
<onlyinclude>

Fixtures
Source: 
 Cancelled matches

Finals

Teams

Number of teams by region

Foreign players

Group stage

Group A

Qualifiers

Fixtures and results
Source: 
 Cancelled matches

Group B

Fixtures and results
Source: 
 Cancelled matches

Knockout stage

Bracket

Semi-finals

Final

Prize money
Winners received 5 lakhs and runners-up received 3 lakhs Rs after the KPL final.

Season statistics

Top scorers

Hat-tricks 
Note: The score of the player's team is displayed first in the result column.

Clean sheets

Season awards

See also
2021–22 season in state football leagues of India
2021–22 Bangalore Super Division
2021–22 Chennai Senior Division

References

Kerala Premier League seasons
2021–22 in Indian football leagues
2021–22 in Indian football